Hung Meng-chi (born 20 April 1947) is a Taiwanese politician. He was the Minister of Culture of the Republic of China from 23 January 2015 until 20 May 2016, having previously served as acting minister since 8 December 2014.

Early life
Hung received his bachelor's degree in history from Tamkang University. He went on to earn his master's and doctoral degrees in East Asian Studies from National Chengchi University.

Career
Hung has taught at several universities, such as Taipei National University of the Arts, Ming Chuan University, Tunghai University and Fo Guang University. He also served as a cultural official for the Taipei County Government. He attempted to resign in September 2015, after Next Magazine alleged that the Ministry of Culture had bribed members of the Kuomintang. Premier Mao Chi-kuo did not accept Hung's offer.

References

Taiwanese Ministers of Culture
Living people
1947 births
Tamkang University alumni
National Chengchi University alumni